NYXL may refer to:

New York Excelsior, an American Overwatch esports team
NYXL (company), the operating company behind New York Excelsior